Thomas Edward Percy Hull (born 20 April 1982), known professionally as Kid Harpoon, is an English singer, songwriter, musician and record producer. In 2023, he won the Grammy Award for Album of the Year and the Brit Award for Songwriter of the Year for his work on Harry's House.

Career 
Already a fixture at local venues in his hometown of Chatham, Kid Harpoon first emerged on the London live music scene in early 2006 as a resident singer-songwriter at Nambucca. His first single, "The River, The Ocean, The Pearl" was released by independent label Brikabrak in 2006 to critical acclaim, earning an instant following from tastemakers NME and Drowned in Sound. Two EPs followed, The First EP, in October 2007, and The Second EP in February 2008.

Upon signing to influential label Young Turks, Kid Harpoon's debut album Once was released in September 2009. The album was recorded in Los Angeles by producer Trevor Horn and received an 8/10 from NME.

Kid Harpoon has also worked with an array of artists. He co-wrote "Shake It Out", "Never Let Me Go", and "Leave My Body" on the Florence + the Machine album Ceremonials with Paul Epworth and Florence Welch. He also co-wrote Calvin Harris' number one single Sweet Nothing with Florence Welch and Harris. Additional writing credits include "The Devil in Me" for Jamie N Commons and three songs on Jessie Ware's debut album Devotion including the single "Wildest Moments". 

In 2012, Kid Harpoon received an Ivor Novello nomination for Florence + the Machine's "Shake It Out".

Along with the likes of Harry Styles, Shawn Mendes, and John Lennon, Kid Harpoon joined the invitation-only U.S. PRO, Global Music Rights (GMR). Since joining the GMR, Kid Harpoon co-wrote and produced Harry Styles' 2022 album, Harry's House, including the number one Billboard Hot 100 single, "As It Was". He co-produced Miley Cyrus' 2023 single "Flowers", which similarly reached number one on the Billboard Hot 100 chart. Harpoon has also written hit songs for Maggie Rogers, and many more.

Personal life 
On 15 May 2015, Hull married his long-time girlfriend Jenny Myles at Dairsie Castle in Scotland.

Discography

Studio albums

Extended plays

Singles
Kid Harpoon – The River, The Ocean, The Pearl, Brikabrak Records – 2006 (Limited CD and vinyl)
"Riverside"
"It's Time"

Awards and nominations

Brit Awards

Grammy Awards

Songwriting and production credits

References

1982 births
Living people
English record producers
English songwriters
English male singer-songwriters
People from Chatham, Kent
XL Recordings artists
Musicians from Kent
21st-century English singers
21st-century British male singers
British male songwriters
Brit Award winners
Grammy Award winners